Gert van den Berg, Gert van den Bergh or Gerrit van den Berg may refer to:
Gert van den Berg (cyclist) (1903-?), Dutch cyclist
Gert van den Berg (politician) (born 1935), Dutch politician
Gert van den Bergh (1920–1968), South African film actor
Col. Gerritt G. Van Den Bergh, Commander of the 5th Albany Militia Regiment